Jiang Bo (born March 13, 1977, in Wafangdian, Liaoning Province) is a female Chinese middle-distance runner. On October 18, 1997, in Shanghai she ran the 1500 metres in 3:50.98 minutes. This ranks her fourth in the world of all time, behind world record holder Genzebe Dibaba, Faith Kipyegon and compatriot Qu Yunxia.

References

1977 births
Living people
Chinese female middle-distance runners
Chinese female long-distance runners
World Athletics record holders (relay)
Athletes from Dalian
Runners from Liaoning
People from Wafangdian